Delbian is a sub-prefecture of Tandjilé Region in Chad.

References 

Populated places in Chad